Nishiyama Station (西山駅) is the name of two train stations in Japan:

 Nishiyama Station (Fukuoka), a station on the Chikuhō Electric Railroad Line
 Nishiyama Station (Niigata), a station on the Echigo Line

See also 
 Nishiyama (disambiguation)